Acronicta rapidan is a species of moth in the family Noctuidae (the owlet moths). It is found in North America.

The MONA or Hodges number for Acronicta rapidan is 9220.

References

Further reading

 
 
 

Acronicta
Articles created by Qbugbot
Moths described in 1912